"Last Shot" is a song co-written and recorded by American country music singer Kip Moore. It is the second single to his third studio album Slowheart. Moore wrote the song with Dan Couch and David Lee Murphy, and produced it himself.

Content
Moore told Sounds Like Nashville that the idea came about when writing with his frequent collaborator Dan Couch. He said that he wanted to give the song an "Aerosmith vibe", and when he started singing a melody to Couch, third writer David Lee Murphy offered the lyric "If you were my last breath, I'd just want to hold you." Upon hearing the line, Moore decided to use the concept of how "the word 'love' is used all too often" to create "an old school country love song".

Commercial performance
The song peaked at number 6 on Country Airplay for chart dated December 8, 2018. has sold 75,000 copies in the United States as of January 2019.

Music video
Directed by PJ Brown, the video features stories of four different friends, one of whom is terminally ill, who unite to have an eventful experience together before they can no longer do so. Moore himself is not present in the video at all. An alternate video, also directed by PJ Brown, features Moore performing the song inside a glass box.

Charts

Weekly charts

Year-end charts

Certifications

References

2017 singles
2017 songs
Kip Moore songs
Songs written by Kip Moore
Songs written by David Lee Murphy
MCA Nashville Records singles
Songs written by Dan Couch